Russia competed at the 2011 World Championships in Athletics from August 27 to September 4 in Daegu, South Korea.

Team selection

The All-Russia Athletic Federation has announced a squad of 83 athletes.
Among the team of 34 men and 49 women are defending World champions Yaroslav Rybakov (High Jump), Valeriy Borchin (20 km Race Walk), Sergey Kirdyapkin (50 km Race Walk), and Olga Kaniskina (20 km Race Walk).

The following athletes appeared on the preliminary Entry List, but not on the Official Start List of the specific event, resulting in a total number of 76 competitors:

Medalists
The following competitors from Russia won medals at the Championships

| width="78%" align="left" valign="top" |

Results

Men

Decathlon

Women

Heptathlon

References

External links
Official local organising committee website
Official IAAF competition website

Russia
World Championships in Athletics
2011